The 2021–22 Segunda División Pro, named Reto Iberdrola for sponsorship reasons, was the 21st season of the second highest league tier of women's football in Spain, and the third and last season under a new two-group format.

Summary
After the unusual two-phase format adopted in the previous campaign due to the impact of the COVID-19 pandemic in Spain, the 2021–22 season began with its intended two-group setup as in 2019–20. However, it was decided that a single-division second tier of 16 teams (to be named Primera Federacion) would be introduced for the next season, with a third tier (Segunda Federacion) taking the two-group setup above the existing Primera Nacional of six groups, which would become the fourth tier. This meant there would be a great deal of movement from the Segunda Pro among its 32 participants at the end of the season:
Two teams moving up to the top division as group winners
Eight teams remaining at the second level based on their group position
Six more teams remaining at the second level by winning a play-off with their counterparts in the other group
The six losers of those playoff matches moving down to the third level
Six teams moving down to the third level based on their group position
Four teams being relegated to the fourth level

While Alhama won the South group by some distance, there was a dramatic conclusion in the North group, as Levante Las Planas (playing in the division below the year before) defeated fellow Catalan club Espanyol (six-time Spanish champions and in the division above the year before) 3–0 in a 'winner takes all' meeting on the final matchday to be promoted. Both groups ended with the team in 5th (remaining in 2nd tier) on the same points as the team in 6th (playoff) and ahead only by the margin of the results between them – although both of those teams who missed out by that narrow margin – Albacete and Deportivo La Coruña – won their playoff match.

North Group

Table 

Source: Federación Española de Fútbol: Clasificación de la Segunda División Femenina de Fútbol – Grupo Norte

South Group

Table 

Source: Federación Española de Fútbol: Clasificación de la Segunda División Femenina de Fútbol – Grupo Sur

Play-offs
One-off ties were played on 31 May 2022, with the pairings allocated by the position in the respective groups: 6th played 11th, 7th played 10th and 8th played 9th.

References

Spa
2
women's 2
Segunda Federación (women) seasons